Pyrgulina nana is a species of sea snail, a marine gastropod mollusk in the family Pyramidellidae, the pyrams and their allies.

Distribution
This species occurs in the eastern part of the Mediterranean Sea, off the following locations:
 Güllük Bay
 Massawa
 Mersin Bay
It is also found in the Aegean Sea and in the Red Sea off Eritrea.

References

 Hornung A. & Mermod G. (1924). Mollusques de la Mer Rouge recueillis par A. Issel faisant partie des collections du Musée Civique d'Histoire Naturelle de Gênes. Première partie, Pyramidellides. Annali del Museo Civico di Storia Naturale Giacomo Doria, Genova, 51: 283-311
  Öztürk, B.; van Aartsen, J.J. (2006). Indo-Pacific species in the Mediterranean. 5. Chrysallida micronana nom. nov. for Chrysallida nana (Hornung and Mermod, 1924) (Gastropoda: Pyramidellidae). Aquatic invasions. 1(4): 241-244

External links
 To Encyclopedia of Life
 To World Register of Marine Species

Pyramidellidae
Gastropods described in 1924